Dina Amer is an Egyptian-American film director, writer, producer and journalist.

Biography
Amer was born and raised in the United States.

Amer's work has been published by The New York Times, CNN, and VICE.
In 2011, she received the Kahlil Gibran Spirit of Humanity Award from the Arab American Institute Foundation (AAIF) for her reporting of the Arab Spring in Egypt. In 2016, she reported on the human trafficking of refugees of the Syrian civil war and the underground economy of the illegal Egypt–Gaza barrier for Vice News program Black Market: Dispatches.

Amer's debut feature film, You Resemble Me, premiered at the 78th Venice International Film Festival. For her screenplay Cain and Abel, which she co-wrote with Omar Mullick, she was invited to the Sundance Screenwriters' Lab in January 2022.

Filmography

Awards and nominations

References

External links
 

Living people
American film directors
American film producers
American journalists
21st-century American screenwriters
American film actresses
American women film producers
Year of birth missing (living people)
American people of Egyptian descent